The 2014 season was Perak's 11th consecutive season in the Malaysian Super League.

Players

First team squad

 PC = President Cup player
 Player names in bold denotes player that left mid-season

Competitions

Super League

League table

FA Cup

Malaysia Cup

Group stage

Statistics

Top scorers
The list is sorted by shirt number when total goals are equal.
{| class="wikitable sortable" style="font-size: 95%; text-align: center;"
|-
!width=10|
!width=10|
!width=10|
!width=150|Player
!width=50|Super League
!width=50|FA Cup
!width=50|Malaysia Cup
!width=50|Total
|-
|rowspan="2"|1
|FW
|50
|align=left| Abdulafees Abdulsalam
|5||0||1||6
|-
|FW
|49
|align=left| Milan Purović
|5||0||1||6
|-
|3
|MF
|43
|align=left| Marco Tulio
|3||0||1||4
|-
|4
|MF
|35
|align=left| Norhakim Isa
|3||0||0||3
|-
|5
|FW
|9
|align=left| Eliel Da Cruz
|2||0||0||2
|-
|rowspan="9"|6
|DF
|42
|align=left| Hassan Daher
|1||0||0||1
|-
|MF
|16
|align=left| J. Partiban
|1||0||0||1
|-
|FW
|28
|align=left| Khairul Asyraf
|1||0||0||1
|-
|MF
|13
|align=left| Sukri Hamid
|1||0||0||1
|-
|MF
|7
|align=left| Kyaw Zayar Win
|0||1||0||1
|-
|DF
|10
|align=left| Hardi Jaafar
|0||1||0||1
|-
|MF
| –
|align=left| Hafiz Ramdan
|0||0||1||1
|-
|MF
|4
|align=left| Nasir Basharudin
|0||0||1||1
|-
|MF
|18
|align=left| Nazri Kamal
|0||0||1||1
|-
|#
|colspan="3"|Own goals
|0
|0
|1
|1 
|-class="sortbottom"
|colspan=4|Total
|22
|2
|7
|31

Transfers
Second transfer window started on 8 April until 22 April.

In

First transfer window

Second transfer window

Out

First transfer window

Second transfer window

References

Perak F.C. seasons
Perak FA